Miguel Acosta Mateos (born 16 March 1998) is a Spanish professional footballer who plays as a right-back for Canadian Premier League club Atlético Ottawa.

Early life
Born in Madrid, Spain, Acosta joined the Atlético Madrid academy in 2010, where he remained until 2017.

Club career
On 29 January 2017, he made his senior debut with Atlético Madrid B in the Tercera División against Unión Adarve.

In July 2017, Acosta signed with fellow Tercera División side Getafe B.

In August 2020, Acosta signed with Atlético Baleares in the Segunda División B. After one season, he departed the club.

In May 2021, Acosta signed with Canadian Premier League side Atlético Ottawa. He led the league in minutes played in 2021, with 2,430, playing the full 90 in every match, except for one match in which he was suspended due to yellow card accumulation. In January 2022, he extended his contract with the club through 2023, with a contract option for 2024. In July 2022, he was named CPL Payer of the Week for Week 13.

Honours

Atlético Ottawa 
 Canadian Premier League
Regular Season: 2022

Career statistics

References

External links

1998 births
Living people
Association football defenders
Spanish footballers
Footballers from Madrid
Spanish expatriate footballers
Expatriate soccer players in Canada
Spanish expatriate sportspeople in Canada
Atlético Madrid B players
Getafe CF B players
CD Atlético Baleares footballers
Atlético Ottawa players
Tercera División players
Segunda División B players
Canadian Premier League players